Clemente Villaverde Huelva (born 8 February 1959), known simply as Clemente, is a Spanish former footballer who played as a left back. He is the current general manager of Getafe CF.

Playing career
Clemente was born in Cangas de Onís, Asturias. He joined Atlético Madrid in 1977, going on to spend the vast majority of his first five years at the club with the reserves, playing two seasons in Segunda División and three in Segunda División B.

Definitely promoted to the main squad for the 1982–83 campaign, Clemente proceeded to be regularly used, helping them to two major titles. He was part of the team that reached the final of the 1986 UEFA Cup Winners' Cup, appearing in the decisive match against FC Dynamo Kyiv (0–3 loss).

In summer 1987, Clemente joined second-tier side CD Málaga alongside Atlético teammate Miguel Ángel Ruiz. He experienced both one La Liga promotion and relegation with the Andalusians, and retired at the age of 31.

Post-retirement
Clemente returned to Atlético subsequently, being CEO Miguel Ángel Gil Marín's right-hand man. In January 2020, after over 25 years in this position, he joined Getafe CF as new general manager.

Honours
Atlético Madrid
Copa del Rey: 1984–85
Supercopa de España: 1985
UEFA Cup Winners' Cup runner-up: 1985–86

Málaga
Segunda División: 1987–88

References

External links

1959 births
Living people
People from Cangas de Onís
Spanish footballers
Footballers from Asturias
Association football defenders
La Liga players
Segunda División players
Segunda División B players
Atlético Madrid B players
Atlético Madrid footballers
CD Málaga footballers